Jeremy R. Miller (born February 9, 1983) is an American politician representing District 28 in the Minnesota Senate, which comprises parts of Fillmore, Houston, and Winona Counties in the southeastern part of the state. He served as the Minnesota Senate Majority Leader from September 2021 to January 2023.

Education
Miller graduated from Winona Senior High School in 2001, and earned his A.A.S. from Minnesota State College-Southeast Technical in Winona in 2004.

Business activities
Miller is the co-owner of Miller Scrap, a scrap metal business.

Minnesota Senate
Miller was first elected to the Senate in 2010, defeating incumbent DFL legislator Sharon Erickson Ropes, and was reelected in 2012, 2016, and 2020. In 2019, he was selected by his caucus to serve as president of the Senate, succeeding Michelle Fischbach, who resigned to become lieutenant governor. In January 2021, Miller was reelected to the position. In September 2021, after Paul Gazelka stepped down as majority leader to run for governor, Republicans elected Miller leader of their caucus, making him the majority leader of the Minnesota State Senate.

Miller considered running for Congress in the 2018 election for the Minnesota's 1st district, covering parts of southern Minnesota; the seat was open because Representative Tim Walz sought the governorship instead. Miller ultimately opted not to run.

Personal life
Miller is married to Janel (Ellinghuysen) and they have three children. He is Jewish.

Miller is a small business owner, and the chief financial officer of Wm. Miller Scrap Iron and Metal Co. in Winona, a family-owned and operated recycling business that dates to 1910. Miller and his two brothers, Todd and Willie, are the fourth generation of their family to be involved in the business and work together with their father and employees.

Miller is a director on the Winona State University Warrior Club board and the Saint Mary's University athletic advisory board. He is also vice president of the Morrie Miller Athletic Foundation, an organization that supports and sustains youth athletics. He is a member of the Winona Area Chamber of Commerce and Minnesota State College – Southeast Technical Alumni Association. He also serves on the Institute of Scrap Recycling Industries (ISRI) Service Corp. Board of Directors, based in Washington, DC.

References

External links

Senator Jeremy Miller official Minnesota Senate website
Senator Jeremy Miller official campaign website
RIOS News Release - New Board Members
Project Vote Smart - Senator Jeremy Miller Profile
Winona Daily News Editorial - August 25, 2009: "Reform and reason"

|-

|-

|-

1983 births
21st-century American politicians
American financiers
Businesspeople from Minnesota
Jewish American state legislators in Minnesota
Living people
People from Winona, Minnesota
Presidents of the Minnesota Senate
Republican Party Minnesota state senators